This article lists the election results of the Brexit Party, known since 2021 as Reform UK, in UK parliamentary elections and in elections to the European Parliament.

European elections, 2019 

The Brexit Party stood in the 2019 European Parliament elections in every regional constituency except Northern Ireland and won the highest number of seats and the most votes nationwide.

Results by regional constituency 

The Brexit Party won at least one seat in every region that they stood in. The party topped the poll in the majority of districts in Great Britain.

Gibraltar 
For elections to the European Parliament, the British Overseas Territory of Gibraltar was a part of the European Parliament constituency combined region of South West England, but votes are counted on the island separately. The table below shows the results of the European Parliament election in Gibraltar.

By-elections, 2019

General election, 2019 

In April 2019, party leader Nigel Farage said the Brexit Party intended to stand candidates at the next general election. The same month, he promised not to stand candidates against the 28 Eurosceptic Conservative MPs who opposed the Brexit withdrawal agreement in Parliament.

When a general election was held in December 2019, the Brexit Party stood in around half of the total seats in England, Scotland and Wales, campaigning most strongly in the red wall (seats long held by Labour Members of Parliament). The party did not stand in seats won by the Conservative Party in 2017 along with a number of exceptional seats; mainly in London, Scotland and the North East. A number of candidates who had been selected to stand in Conservative constituencies went on to run in the election as independent candidates on a Pro-Brexit platform.

As largely expected, the Brexit Party failed to win any seats in the general election. Among its best results were in Barnsley Central, where Victoria Felton came second with 30.4% of the vote; Hartlepool, where party chairman Richard Tice came third with 25.8% of the vote; and Hull West and Hessle, where businesswoman and media personality Michelle Dewberry came third with 18% of the vote.

Results by constituency

By-elections, 2021–

Notes 
Bold denotes that either the majority of votes went in favour of Brexit or the percentage of votes was enough to retain the election deposit (5%).

*denotes that the candidate was originally selected as a Brexit Party prospective parliamentary candidate in a Conservative seat but after those candidates were pulled, they eventually stood as independent candidates.

Mayoral elections, 2021 
Reform UK endorsed Laurence Fox in the 2021 London mayoral election.

Police elections, 2021 
Reform UK stood candidates in 12 police and crime commissioner elections and one subsequent re-run election in Wiltshire.

By-election

References 

Reform UK
Brexit
Election results by party in the United Kingdom
2019 in British politics
Euroscepticism in the United Kingdom